The Omilteme cottontail (Sylvilagus insonus) is a cottontail rabbit found only in the state of Guerrero, Mexico in the mountain range of Sierra Madre del Sur. Belonging to the family Leporidae, it is one of fourteen species in the genus Sylvilagus, a genus restricted to the New World. The Omilteme cottontail is considered one of the most endangered rabbit species in the world and is only known and been described by very few specimens.

Description 
The Omilteme cottontail is a large rabbit with long ears (greater than 53mm from the base), hind feet of medium length (greater than 81mm) and a short tail. This rabbit has a very distinct coat colouration. Around the nose and orbital area, the coat is a dull grey. The convex surface of the ears is a dark brown-black colour and the black is also very concentrated along the anterior border as well as on the tips of the ears. The dorsal side is rufous (a red-brown colour) mixed with black while the sides are grey-black in colour. The medium-sized hind feet are white on the dorsal side and the soles are a dark brown. The dorsal side of the tail is reddish-black while the ventral side is white

Anatomy 
The literature available on the anatomy of Sylvilagus insonus mainly concentrates on the skull and therefore distinguishing features of the Omilteme cottontail's skull have been well described. The supraorbital process is flat, attached to the braincase and has two extensions (anterior and posterior). The anterior extension of the supraorbital process is attached to the skull while the posterior extension is slender and can be free of the brain case or attached with a slit in between the process and the braincase. The supraoccipital shield is square shaped. The skull also has a narrow basioccipital and is very broad across the carotid foramina.

The incisive foramen and the diastema are short. The premaxillaries have dorsal extensions. They have large maxillary and mandibular tooth rows. The Omilteme cottontail is heterodont with a total of 28 teeth. They have incisors, premolars and molars, and lack canines.

Differences from other members of the genus Sylvilagus 
Sylvilagus insonus differs from S. brasiliensis (forest rabbit) and S. dicei (Dice's cottontail) in that it has a larger skull, wider zygomatic bone, deeper rostrum, wider carotid foramina and dorsal extensions of the premaxillaries that extend posterior to the nasal instead. S. insonus also has a narrower basioccipital and narrower post-dental. In external appearance, the Omilteme cottontail has a longer bicoloured tail (rufous and black) instead of a uni-coloured tail (solely brown); hind feet with white and brown versus hind feet of only brown; and longer ears.

In contrast, S. insonus differs from S. cunicularius (Mexican cottontail) with whom it shares its habitat by being smaller in size. Most notably S. insonus is smaller in: length of upper incisors, skull length, nasal length, width of basioccipital, auditory bulla length, the depth of shield bullae, skull depth, width across infraorbital canals, mandible height and mandible ramus depth. In colour, dorsally the Omilteme cottontail is a rufous-black colour whereas the Mexican cottontail is only grey dorsally.

Taxonomy and systematics 
There is no fossil evidence of Sylvilagus insonus and it is only known from its type locality in the province of Guerrero, Mexico. The exact phylogenetic relationship between S. insonus to other species in the genus Sylvilagus is still unknown but the only other member of the genus living in Guerrero is S. cunicularius.

Distribution 
S. insonus is endemic to Mexico and is found only in Sierra Madre del Sur of the State of Guerrero. It is only known from its type locality, Omiltemi Ecological State Park, located in a wooded summit of a semi-isolated mountain range. Its habitat range is 2,133-3048m elevation. Surrounding the wooded area is the village of Omiltemi at 2,332m above sea level (in Municipio Chilpancingo). The Omilteme cottontail is therefore restricted to a region of less than 500 square kilometres.

Ecology 
The Omilteme cottontail lives at the summit of a mountain range which has steep slopes and ravines covered with dense cloud forests. Some pine and pine-oak forests are present as well. It shares its habitat with 37 other mammal species. In the dense cloud forests, the rabbit lives amongst the undergrowth where it makes runways and burrows under objects such as rocks.

It is a mainly nocturnal mammal.

Status and conservation 
According to the IUCN Red List of Threatened Species, the Omilteme cottontail is data deficient. The major threats to the survival of this species are poaching and habitat destruction caused by deforestation. This rabbit went unreported in the wild from the early 1900s to the 1990s; however, two specimens were captured in 1998, confirming that the species was still extant. The rabbit is among the 25 "most wanted lost" species that are the focus of Global Wildlife Conservation's "Search for Lost Species" initiative.

References 

Sylvilagus
Mammals described in 1904
Taxa named by Edward William Nelson
Endemic mammals of Mexico
Fauna of the Sierra Madre del Sur